Aomori 2nd district (青森県第2区, Aomori-ken dai-niku or simply 青森2区, Aomori-niku) is a single-member constituency of the House of Representatives in the national Diet of Japan. It is located in Northeastern Aomori and covers the prefecture's Towada, Misawa, and Mutsu cities, Shimokita District, a portion of Kamikita District, and the town of Gonohe within Sannohe District.

As of 2015, this district was home to 250,364 constituents, roughly half the number of Japan's largest district, Tokyo 1st district. The district is the northernmost Japanese House of Representatives district on Honshu.

Aomori is a so-called "Liberal Democratic kingdom," meaning that it frequently returns members of Japan's Liberal Democratic Party. The district's current representative, Akinori Eto, has represented the district continuously since 2003, one of few Liberal Democratic representatives not voted out of office during the Democratic Party of Japan's rapid rise to power during the 2009 general election. Eto served as Minister of Defense in 2014, during Prime Minister Shinzō Abe's 2nd cabinet rotation.

List of representatives

Election results

References

Districts of the House of Representatives (Japan)